Belhavel Lough is a freshwater lake in the northwest of Ireland. It is located in north County Leitrim near the village of Killarga.

Geography and hydrology
The lake drains east into the Diffagher River, which eventually reaches Lough Allen.

Ecology
The water quality was reported to be satisfactory  with a mesotrophic rating, but had a "" ecological status  indicating pollution, though Zebra mussel infestation was not reported. The ecology of Belhavel Lough, and other Leitrim waterways, is threatened by curly waterweed, zebra mussel, and freshwater clam invasive species.

See also
List of loughs in Ireland

References and notes

Notes

Primary sources

Secondary sources

Lakes of County Leitrim